The Akwa Ibom Christmas Carols Festival is a large gathering of carol singers in Nigeria.  A concert featuring 25,272 carol singers at the Akwa Ibom Stadium, Uyo, Akwa Ibom, Nigeria, with Guinness World Records representatives in attendance, was officially certified as the largest such gathering in the world by Guinness World Records on December 13, 2014, against a former record of 15,674 carol singers which was achieved the previous year (December 15, 2013) by a group called CENTI in Bogotá, Colombia.

History

2012–2013 edition 
The 2012 festival featured artistes like Alvin Slaughter and Donnie McClurkin from the US and the Chorale Devine de Merveilles of the Republic of Congo. The 2013 edition was attended by Bishop Oyedepo of Living Faith Church Worldwide (Winners' Chapel) and human rights activist, Rev. Jesse Jackson, and featured the National Choir of the Federation of St. Kitts and Nevis, international singers like Lionel Peterson and Israel Houghton, and Nigerian singers like Bongos Ikwue, Frank Edwards, Nathaniel Bassey, Aity Dennis Inyang, el Mafrex, Freke Umoh, and Fadabasi.

2014 edition 
The 2014 event broke a Guinness World Record to become the "Largest Assembly of Carol Singers on the Face of the Earth". In attendance were Don Moen, international gospel music composer, and Cardinal John Onaiyekan of Abuja Catholic Diocese. The event featured special performances by Quartets from the five international choirs that performed in past editions. Also performing were gospel saxophonist Angela Christie, Lionel Peterson, Sinach, Harmonious Chorale and many more.

2016 edition 
In 2016, the Akwa Ibom State Government organized the concert again on December 17, 2016. With guest artists from around the world such as Award Winning gospel singer, Don Moen, PRM band, The Kayamba Africa Choral Ensemble and Kenya Boys Choir. Some locals artists from Nigeria such as Sammie Okposo, Buchi, Steve Crown, Elijah Oyelade, Rev. Fr. Patrick Edet, Esther Edoho, Julius Nglass and Perfecta Ekpo were also be in attendance.

2018 - edition 
In 2018, at the Akwa Ibom State Carols Festival, Aity Dennis was among the ministers who graced that event. She Performed after the gospel music minister sensation, Mercy Chinwo, and before American import, Nicole Mullen, Aity performed her prophetic song at the Uyo Township Stadium, she sang, danced and prophesied a glorious future for Akwa Ibom state and Nigeria.

Aity spoke after the event, saying: "It’s always a big pleasure every time I have a performance in my home state. I am also glad I had the opportunity to perform the theme song. Let the People Say Amen!. She congratulate the Governor, Mr. Udom Emmanuel and the coordinator of the carol for a successful event."

Gallery

References

External links
Glo Lifts 2015 Akwa Ibom Christmas Carol Festival
The Inaugural Edition of Akwa Ibom State 9,999 Christmas Carol

Christmas festivals